The Heights Tower is a 125 metres tall up-scale residential tower, located in the district of Al-Abdali, in Amman, Jordan. It is part of Abdali Project. The Tower features luxurious apartments, restaurants, gym, spa and a pool deck.

See also
List of tallest buildings in Amman

References

Buildings and structures in Amman
Skyscrapers in Amman
Tourist attractions in Amman
Residential skyscrapers